Left-bank Ukraine is a historic name of the part of Ukraine on the left (east) bank of the Dnieper River, comprising the modern-day oblasts of Chernihiv, Poltava and Sumy as well as the eastern parts of Kyiv and Cherkasy.

History 
The term appeared in 1663 with the election of Ivan Bryukhovetsky as the hetman of Ukraine in opposition to Pavlo Teteria. Bryukhovetsky was the first known "left-bank Ukraine" hetman over the area that was under the Russian influence.

Up until the mid-17th century, the area had belonged to the Polish–Lithuanian Commonwealth. The Treaty of Pereyaslav of 1654 saw the region tentatively come under Russian control, when local Cossack leaders swore allegiance to the Russian monarchy in exchange for military protection. Russian sovereignty over the area was later reaffirmed in the Treaty of Andrusovo (1667) and the Eternal Peace Treaty (1686) between the Polish–Lithuanian Commonwealth and Tsardom of Russia.

Under Russian rule, the left-bank Ukraine initially enjoyed a degree of autonomy within the Tsardom (from 1721, Imperial Russia) as the Cossack Hetmanate, which was slowly withdrawn throughout the eighteenth century when the Zaporizhian Sich was destroyed.

Related article 
 Right-bank Ukraine

References 

Geographic history of Ukraine
Historical regions in Ukraine
Early Modern history of Ukraine
Subdivisions of the Russian Empire
Cossack Hetmanate